Clusia is the type genus of the plant family Clusiaceae. Comprising 300-400 species, it is native to the tropics of the Americas. The genus is named by Carl Linnaeus in honor of the botanist Carolus Clusius.

The closest relatives of Clusia are the neotropical genera Chrysochlamys, Tovomita, Dystovomita and Tovomitopsis. Together with Clusia, these genera form the tribe Clusieae, where the fruit is a fleshy capsule with arillate seeds.

The distribution ranges from the Florida Keys and southern Mexico to southernmost Brazil, and from near sea level to at least 3500 m altitude in the northern Andes. Species of Clusia are a characteristic component of a number of Neotropical vegetation types, and may even be dominant, as is often seen in montane forests of the Greater Antilles. Most species are found in lowland or montane rainforests, but some occur in drier habitats such as the restingas of Brazil, caribbean coastal scrub and dry interandean valleys. A number of species are confined to rocky habitats, such as tepuis or granitic inselbergs. A few grow as scattered shrubs in paramo. The apomictic Clusia rosea is an invasive alien in Hawaii and Sri Lanka, and possibly elsewhere.

Description
Its species are shrubs, vines and small to medium-size trees up to 20 m tall, with evergreen foliage. Some species start life as epiphytes which grow long roots that descend to the ground and eventually strangle and kill the host tree in a manner similar to strangler figs.

Many Clusia species have Crassulacean acid metabolism, which can be considered an adaptation to the often dry (micro)habitats of the genus.

The plants contain variously coloured latex in stems, leaves and fruit. The leaves are simple, entire and opposite, 5–70 cm long and 2–20 cm broad. Leaf texture is usually leathery, less commonly rigid or slightly succulent. Flower size varies from ca 5 mm wide (e.g. Clusia gundlachii) to ca 150 mm in Clusia grandiflora. The 4-9 petals are white, cream, yellow, pink, red, blackish or green. Flowers are unisexual and plants are dioecious (pistillate and staminate flowers are borne on separate plants). Stamen number ranges from four to several hundred. Shape and size of stamens are extremely variable. Sterile stamens are often present, both in pistillate and staminate flowers. Stigmas are four to 16 in number and usually sessile. The fruit is a leathery valvate capsule which splits open to release several red or orange, fleshy-coated seeds.

Pollination involves a range of different animals, and several types of rewards. Floral resin occurs in many, probably most species of Clusia. The resin is produced by the stamens (by sterile stamens, referred to as staminodes, in pistillate flowers) and is collected by bees that use it in nest construction.  Nectar is most common in montane species, e.g. Clusia clusioides, and these flowers are visited by insects such as moths and wasps, and sometimes by bats or hummingbirds. In flowers lacking nectar or resin, pollination may be carried out by pollen-eating beetles, which visit also the rewardless pistillate flowers, as observed in Clusia criuva. Clusia blattophila is pollinated by male cockroaches attracted by a pheromone-containing fluid produced by the flowers.

Seeds are dispersed by birds and perhaps, in some cases, by small mammals.

Clusia plants provide excellent nesting sites for some insects. For instance, Clusia grandiflora, a common species in Guianese forests, is an attractive place for Polistes pacificus wasps to build their paper nests because arboreal ants, which often prey on these wasps, do not normally reside in this species of tree.

Uses
The wood of Clusia is highly durable, and is sometimes used for roof construction. The latex and the floral resin have antiseptic properties and have been used to seal wounds. Dry latex is sometimes burned like incense in churches. A few species are grown as house plants, or, in tropical areas, as ornamental trees and shrubs. Examples are Clusia rosea, C. major and C. orthoneura.

Selected species
 Clusia alata
 Clusia amazonica
 Clusia blattophila
 Clusia bracteosa
 Clusia carinata
 Clusia caudata
 Clusia celiae
 Clusia clarendonensis
 Clusia clusioides
 Clusia cochlitheca
 Clusia croatii
 Clusia colombiana
 Clusia columnaris
 Clusia congestiflora
 Clusia crenata
 Clusia cuneifolia
 Clusia cupulata
 Clusia decussata
 Clusia dixonii
 Clusia ducu
 Clusia ducuoides
 Clusia duidae
 Clusia elliptica
 Clusia flava
 Clusia flavida
 Clusia fluminensis Planch. & Triana
 Clusia fockeana
 Clusia frigida
 Clusia fructiangusta
 Clusia garciabarrigae
 Clusia gardneri
 Clusia grandiflora
 Clusia gundlachii
 Clusia hammeliana
 Clusia haugtii
 Clusia hilariana
 Clusia hydrogera
 Clusia hyleae
 Clusia insignis
 Clusia lanceolata
 Clusia latipes
 Clusia laurifolia
 Clusia laxiflora
 Clusia leprantha
 Clusia lineata
 Clusia longipetiolata
 Clusia longistyla
 Clusia loretensis
 Clusia magnoliiflora
 Clusia major 
 Clusia melchiorii
 Clusia mexiensis
 Clusia minor
 Clusia minutiflora
 Clusia nemorosa
 Clusia nubium
 Clusia octandra
 Clusia orthoneura
 Clusia osseocarpa
 Clusia pallida
 Clusia palmicida
 Clusia panapanari
 Clusia paralicola G.Mariz 1972
 Clusia penduliflora
 Clusia pernambucensis
 Clusia platystigma
 Clusia plurivalvis
 Clusia polystigma
 Clusia portlandiana
 Clusia pseudomangle
 Clusia pulcherrima
 Clusia renggerioides
 Clusia rigida
 Clusia rosea – Scotch attorney, autograph tree, pitch-apple
 Clusia schomburgkiana
 Clusia sellowiana
 Clusia skotaster
 Clusia sphaerocarpa
 Clusia spiritu-sanctensis
 Clusia stenophylla
 Clusia tarmensis
 Clusia thurifera
 Clusia triflora
 Clusia trochiformis
 Clusia uvitana
 Clusia valerioi
 Clusia venusta
 Clusia viscida
 Clusia weberbaueri
 Clusia weddelliana

Gallery

References

Correia MCR, Ormond WT, Pinheiro MCB, Lima HA (1993) Estudos da biologia floral de Clusia criuva Camb. um caso de mimetismo. Bradea 24:209–219

Gustafsson, M. H. G. and V. Bittrich (2003) Evolution of morphological diversity and resin secretion in flowers of Clusia L. (Clusiaceae): insights from ITS sequence variation. Nordic Journal of Botany 22: 183-203.

Gustafsson, M. H. G. (2012) A new xeromorphic species of Clusia (Clusiaceae) from dry valleys of northern Peru. Novon 20: 414-417

Gustafsson, M. H. G., V. Bittrich and K. Winter (2007) Diversity, phylogeny and classification of Clusia. In U. Lüttge (ed.) Ecological studies vol. 194. Clusia: a woody Neotropical genus of remarkable plasticity and diversity, pp. 95–116. Springer, Heidelberg.

Bittrich, V and M. C. E. Amaral (1996)Flower Morphology and Pollination Biology of Some Clusia Species from the Gran Sabana (Venezuela)
Kew Bulletin 51: 681-694.

External links

Clusia rosea photos
Key to Clusia species from Brazil 

 
Malpighiales genera
Epiphytes
Dioecious plants